In the Roman tradition, oaths were sworn upon Iuppiter Lapis or the Jupiter Stone located in the Temple of Jupiter, Capitoline Hill. Iuppiter Lapis was held in the Roman tradition to be an Oath Stone, an aspect of Jupiter in his role as divine lawmaker responsible for order and used principally for the investiture of the oathtaking of office.

According to Cyril Bailey, in "The Religion of Ancient Rome" (1907):

See also
 Fetishism

References

Jupiter (mythology)
Stones